The Hoosier Athletic Conference is a ten-member IHSAA-Sanctioned conference located within Benton, Cass, Hamilton, Howard, Jasper, Tippecanoe, Tipton and White counties. The conference first began in 1947, and has been in constant competition except for the 1997-98 school year, when membership dropped to three schools. The conference added four schools from the folding Mid-Indiana Conference in 2015.

Membership 

 Central Catholic played from 1993 to 2011 in the HHC.
 Rensselaer played from 1949 to 1954 and 1958 to 1968 as an independent, 1954 to 1958 in the old NSC, and 1968 to 1998 in the NWHC.
 Western played from 1965 to 2015 in the MIC.

Divisions

Former Members 

 Attica played in both the HAC and WRC from 1966 until leaving the HAC in 1971.
 Delphi's school board voted to leave the HAC after 2015-16 in November 2015. The school refused to honor the football contracts for 2016-17 (schedules are made on a bi-yearly basis for football in Indiana), so the HAC decided to remove the school from the league effective immediately on December 17, 2015. Since the departure happened in the middle of the school year instead of during the summer, the exit date is listed as 2016, since the school completed the fall season sports as conference members.
 Winamac played in both the HAC and NWHC from 1968 to 1972.
 Sheridan played in both the HCC and HAC throughout its tenure in the HAC.
 Carroll and Clinton Prairie were also members of the Mid-Central Conference from 1966 until 1975.

Membership timeline

Conference Champions

Football 

 Football was first sponsored in 1972. Unlisted seasons between 1974 and 1984 are unverified. There was no champion in 1997.

Boys' Basketball 

 The 1948-49, 1957–59, 1964–67, and 1971-93 champions are unverified. There was no champion in 1997-98.

Girls' Basketball 

 Seasons before 2000-01 are unverified.

State Champions
IHSAA State Champions

Cass Kings (3)
 Basketball- 2A (2003)
 Softball- 2A (2006)
 Softball- 2A (2008)

Central Catholic Knights (16)
 1976 Football (A)
 1998 Boys' Basketball (A)
 1999 Football (A)
 2000 Boys' Basketball (A)
 2003 Boys' Basketball (A)
 2004 Baseball (A)
 2006 Girls' Basketball (A)
 2007 Baseball (A)
 2009 Baseball (A)
 2009 Football (A)
 2010 Baseball (A)
 2010 Football (A)
 2010 Volleyball (A)
 2011 Baseball (A)
 2019 Football (A)
 2021 Girls' Volleyball (A)
All championships before 2011-2012 school year as members of Hoosier Heartland Conference.

Northwestern Tigers (3)
 2007 Boys' Basketball (2A)
 2018 Girls' Basketball (3A)
 2019 Girls' Basketball (3A)

Sheridan Blackhawks(9)
 1980 Football (A)
 1984 Football (A)
 1987 Football (A)
 1988 Football (A)
 1992 Football (A)
 1998 Football (A)
 2005 Football (A)
 2006 Football (A)
 2007 Football (A)

Tipton Blue Devils (2)
 1990 Softball
 1994 Boys' Golf

Twin Lakes Indians(1)
 1989 Softball

West Lafayette Red Devils(5)
 1964 Boys' Cross Country
 1993 Football (2A)
 1998 Girls' Basketball (3A)
 2009 Football (3A)
 2013 Girls' Soccer (A)
 2014 Boys' Cross Country
 2018 Football (3A)

Western Panthers (5)
 2018 Tyler Gilbert, Discus
 2017 Tyler Gilbert, Discus
 1988 Michelle Faulkner, 800 Meters
 2001 Girls' Golf
 2006 Brandon Youngdale, High Jump
 2012 Baseball, (3A)
 2014 Girls' Basketball, (3A)
 1977 Joe Schwartz, Wrestling

Rensselaer Bombers (1)
2014 Football (2A)

References

Resources 
 IHSAA Conferences
 IHSAA Directory

Indiana high school athletic conferences
High school sports conferences and leagues in the United States
1947 establishments in Indiana